Abdirahman Mohamud Haji Hassan is a Somali politician. He was the Mayor of Galkacyo, the capital of the Mudug region in north-central Somalia. A local businessman, Haji was appointed to the position in a 2009 election overseen by the autonomous Puntland administration. He was succeeded in office on August 24, 2011 by Saeed Abdi Farah.

References

Ethnic Somali people
Living people
Mayors of places in Somalia
Year of birth missing (living people)